Kenneth Grant MacLeod (2 February 1888 – 7 March 1967) was a Scottish international rugby union player, as well as a golfer, soccer player and cricketer.

MacLeod was inducted into the Scottish Sports Hall of Fame in March 2010.

Career
He was only seventeen when first capped for  against , and was at Fettes College. He then went to Cambridge University and played for their rugby team, winning nine more international caps at the time. He retired at twenty one at the urging of his father, because his two elder brothers had been seriously injured playing rugby.

Allan Massie writes:

MacLeod's club was Cambridge University RFC.

He was the brother of Lewis MacLeod who was also capped for Scotland.

Other sports
MacLeod also played cricket for Cambridge University, Lancashire, and other teams. He appeared in 94 first-class matches as a righthanded batsman who bowled right arm fast. He scored 3,458 runs with a highest score of 131 among six first-class centuries and held 108 catches. He took 103 wickets with a best analysis of six for 29.

MacLeod played association football for Manchester City F.C. He also later won the Amateur Golf Championship of Natal.

See also
 List of Scottish cricket and rugby union players

References
 Bath, Richard (ed.) The Scotland Rugby Miscellany (Vision Sports Publishing Ltd, 2007 )
 Massie, Allan A Portrait of Scottish Rugby (Polygon, Edinburgh)

1888 births
1967 deaths
Association footballers not categorized by position
Cambridge University cricketers
Cambridge University R.U.F.C. players
Free Foresters cricketers
Gentlemen cricketers
Lancashire cricketers
Manchester City F.C. players
Marylebone Cricket Club cricketers
People educated at Fettes College
People from Bearsden
Scotland international rugby union players
Scottish cricketers
Scottish footballers
Scottish male golfers
Scottish rugby union players